Independente Futebol São Joseense, known as Independente or São Joseense, is a Brazilian football club based in São José dos Pinhais, Paraná. Founded in 2015, the club plays in the Campeonato Paranaense.

History
Founded on 22 May 2015, São Joseense played their first competition in the 2016 Campeonato Paranaense Série Bronze, the third division of the state league. In 2017, the club won the third division, and played four seasons in the Campeonato Paranaense Série Prata before achieving promotion in 2021 as champions.

In March 2022, the club ensured their qualification in the 2023 Série D, after finishing in the top eight of the year's Campeonato Paranaense.

Honours
 Campeonato Paranaense Série Prata:
 Winners (1): 2021

 Campeonato Paranaense Série Bronze:
 Winners (1): 2017

References

Association football clubs established in 2015
Football clubs in Paraná (state)
2015 establishments in Brazil